Afra may refer to:

People
Saint Afra (died 304), a Christian martyr
Vahid Afra (1986– ), an Iranian football player
Afra (beatboxer) (1980– ), a Japanese musician

Places
Afra, Iran, a village in Mazandaran Province, Iran
Afra, Morocco, a village near Agdz
St. Ulrich's and St. Afra's Abbey, Augsburg, Bavaria, Germany
Sächsisches Landesgymnasium Sankt Afra zu Meißen, a school for gifted students in Meißen, Germany

Other uses
Afra language, a nearly extinct Papuan language
Afra (moth), a genus of snout moths in the subfamily Epipaschiinae
Afra Airlines, in Ghana
AFRA (Aircraft Fleet Recycling Association)
American Federation of Radio Artists, later the American Federation of Television and Radio Artists

See also
Aframax, a size limitation on ships passing through the Suez Canal